Qahderijan (also Romanized as Qahderījān; also known as Kedargūn, Qadrijān; and Qadrjā)  is a city in the Central District of Falavarjan County, Isfahan Province, Iran.  At the 2006 census, its population was 30,002, in 7,725 families.

For its public transit system, the city is served by Falavarjan County Municipalities Mass Transit Organization bus network route 2.

References

Populated places in Falavarjan County
Cities in Isfahan Province